Daisy Linda Ward, née Travers (1883–1937) was a still life painter from New Jersey, best known for her collection of Dutch and Flemish still life paintings that was bequeathed by her husband in her name to the Ashmolean Museum.

Ward was born in New Jersey and married the British businessman Theodore William Holzapfel, who had taken his mother's maiden name of Ward to avoid anti-German sentiment during World War One. The couple collected Dutch and Flemish 17th-century paintings. She became a still life painter and took her inspiration from works in her collection and elsewhere. She showed her work at the Royal Academy summer exhibition for the first time in 1925. Two of her paintings were included in the Ashmolean bequest that comprises 96 paintings.

References 

 The Collection of Dutch and Flemish Still-Life Paintings Bequeathed by Daisy Linda Ward ... By Fred G. Meijer
 Background of the Daisy Linda Ward bequest

1883 births
1937 deaths
People from New Jersey
American women painters